Haedropleura pellyi is a species of sea snail, a marine gastropod mollusk in the family Horaiclavidae.

Description

Distribution
This marine species occurs in the Persian Gulf, off Madagascar, the Andaman and Nicobar Islands, Myanmar, Thailand

References

 Worldwide Mollusca Species Data Base: Haedropleura pellyi

External links
  Tucker, J.K. 2004 Catalog of recent and fossil turrids (Mollusca: Gastropoda). Zootaxa 682:1-1295.

pellyi
Gastropods described in 1882